Lycée Paul Robert is a senior high school in Les Lilas, Seine-Saint-Denis, France, in the Paris metropolitan area. It is located in the Creteil Academy, that includes the departments of Seine-Saint-Denis and Seine-et-Marne

 it has about 800 students. It opened in 1994. Roger Taillibert was the building's architect. He decides to build a building, which reminds one of a boat.

References

External links
Lycée Paul Robert 
 Lycée Paul Robert  (Archive)

Lycées in Seine-Saint-Denis
1994 establishments in France
Educational institutions established in 1994